Out of Sight is a 1998 criminal comedy film directed by Steven Soderbergh, based on the Elmore Leonard novel.

Out of Sight may also refer to:

 Out of Sight (album), a 1964 Funk album by James Brown
 "Out of Sight" (song), a 1964 song recorded by James Brown
 Out of Sight (1966 film), a 1966 beach party/spy spoof film directed by Lennie Weinrib
 Out of Sight (TV series), a 1996–1998 British children's television series
 Out of Sight (novel), a 1996 novel by Elmore Leonard
 "Out of Sight", a song from the 1999 Mike Oldfield album Guitars
 "Out of Sight" (short story), a Black Widowers short story by Isaac Asimov
 "Out of Sight" (Charmed), an episode of the television series Charmed
 "Out of Sight", a song by Smash Mouth from the album Smash Mouth
 "Out of Sight", a song by hip-hop duo Run the Jewels from the album RTJ4
 "Out of Sight", a song by Emma Muscat that is Malta's withdrawn entry for the Eurovision Song Contest 2022
 "Out of Sight", a 2010 animation short directed and written by Ya-Ting Yu

See also
 Out of Mind, Out of Sight (disambiguation)
Out of Site (disambiguation)
 Outasight (born 1983), American rapper